Crataegus ater, known as the Nashville hawthorn, is a species of hawthorn that grows as a shrub or tree, native to the Great Lakes region of North America.

Distribution
The native range of Crataegus ater includes Michigan, Ohio in the U.S., and Ontario in Canada.

References

ater
Flora of the Great Lakes region (North America)
Flora of Eastern Canada
Flora of Michigan
Flora of Ohio
Flora of Ontario
Trees of the Plains-Midwest (United States)
Flora of North America
Flora without expected TNC conservation status